Cottey may refer to:

Cottey College, a college in Nevada, Missouri, United States
Cottey Creek, a stream in Knox County, Missouri, United States

People with the surname
Tony Cottey (born 1966), Welsh cricketer